Heartwork is the eighth studio album by American rock band The Used. It was released on April 24, 2020 on Big Noise.

Background 

In mid-2019, the Used signed to their long-time friend and producer John Feldmann's record label Big Noise. They started recording the album in June 2019, took a break to headline the Disrupt Festival tour, and finished recording the album in November 2019.  A music video for the single "Blow Me" was released in December 2019, "Paradise Lost, a poem by John Milton" in February, and "Cathedral Bell" in April. This is the first album to feature Joey Bradford on guitar after Justin Shekoski left in 2018.  The band recorded 27 songs during the Heartwork sessions and plan on releasing another album later in 2020 that will include the remaining songs. The deluxe edition was eventually published on September 10, 2021.

Reception

The album appears in Alternative Press's The 50 best albums of 2020 list, with the following justification: "The Used rarely shy away from tugging at your heartstrings, and the sonically and stylistically diverse album more than does the trick in the emotion department. [...] This release is certainly their most consistent front-to-back album since 2009's Artwork".

Ali Shutler of NME rated the album four out of five stars, writing that the Used returned to their heart-pounding choruses and pop sensibilities after their experimental work with The Canyon. She wrote that "Heartwork is full of dark, brooding songs" that are familiar but daring.

At gigwise.com, Laviea Thomas gave it eight out of ten stars. She noted that the album started with flying riffs and swirling energy that becomes a joyous ride ending with an emotional goodbye as McCracken pleads, "I just wanna feel something, anything is better than this." Thomas also wrote that the return of Feldmann was "an undeniable part of the magic behind this album."

"Paradise Lost, a poem by John Milton" is one of the 68 best rock songs of 2020 according to Loudwire and it is described as follows: "A strummy start gives way to more fleshed out aggression as The Used vocalist Bert McCracken belts about the angst of not being able to cut ties while knowing a situation is still bad for you. The singer taps into the pain of knowing something but being reluctant to acknowledge it".

Track listing

Personnel 
 Bert McCracken – vocals
 Jeph Howard – bass, backing vocals
 Dan Whitesides – drums, backing vocals
 Joey Bradford – guitars, backing vocals

Additional musicians
 Jason Aalon Butler – on "Blow Me"
 Mark Hoppus – on "The Lighthouse"
 Travis Barker – on "Obvious Blasé"
 Caleb Shomo – on "The Lottery"

Production
 John Feldmann – producer, mixing, string arrangements
 Dylan McLean – engineer, additional production
 Scot Stewart – engineer, mixing, additional production
 Dave Kutch – mastering
 Michael Bono – assistant engineer
 Jacob Magness – assistant engineer
 Josh Thornberry – assistant engineer
 Cam Rackam – cover art and art direction
 Damien Lawson – additional design

Charts

References 

2020 albums
The Used albums
Albums produced by John Feldmann